Yukiko Kawamorita is a former international table tennis player from Japan.

Table tennis career
She won a bronze medal at the 1971 World Table Tennis Championships in the women's doubles with Setsuko Kobori.

See also
 List of table tennis players
 List of World Table Tennis Championships medalists

References

Japanese female table tennis players
World Table Tennis Championships medalists
Possibly living people
Year of birth missing